John Smith Chipman (August 10, 1800 – July 27, 1869) was a lawyer and politician from the U.S. state of Michigan.

Chipman was born in Shoreham, Vermont, a son of Barnabas and Polly (Smith) Chipman. He attended the rural schools and graduated from Middlebury College in 1823. He studied law, was admitted to the bar, and practiced in Addison County, Vermont, and Essex County, New York.

In 1838, he moved to Centreville in St. Joseph County, Michigan, where he held several local offices including serving as a member of the Michigan State House of Representatives in 1842. Chipman was elected as a Democrat from Michigan's 2nd District to the Twenty-ninth Congress, serving from March 4, 1845, to March 3, 1847. After the end of his term, he moved to Niles in Berrien County, Michigan, and later, in 1850, he moved to San Francisco, California, where he resumed the practice of law. He moved to San Jose, California, in 1869 and lived in retirement there until his death. He is interred in Oak Hill Cemetery in San Jose.

He was regarded as a brilliant lawyer and a natural orator. Bingham writes that "listening to one of his speeches was like reading one of Cooper's novels."  He was over six feet tall with black hair and a dark complexion, giving rise to his nickname, Black Chip.

Family
In October 1824, Chipman married Frances Larabee. They were the parents of William H. Chipman and Frances C. Chipman.

References

A twentieth century history of Berrien County, Michigan. Coolidge, Orville William. Chicago: Lewis Publishing Co., 1906. p. 37
Early history of Michigan, with biographies of state officers, members of Congress, judges and legislators.  Bingham, S. D. (Stephen D.). Lansing: Thorp & Godfrey, state printers, 1888. pp 170–171

1800 births
1869 deaths
Members of the Michigan House of Representatives
People from Shoreham, Vermont
Middlebury College alumni
Democratic Party members of the United States House of Representatives from Michigan
19th-century American politicians
People from Centreville, Michigan
California Democrats
Burials at Oak Hill Memorial Park
California lawyers
Michigan lawyers
New York (state) lawyers
Vermont lawyers
19th-century American lawyers